Thungathurthy mandal is one of the 23 mandals in the Suryapet district of the Indian state of Telangana. It is under the administration of the Suryapet revenue division with its headquarters at Thungathurthy. It is bounded by Nagaram mandal, Nuthankal mandal, Maddirala mandal, and Mahabubabad district on the west, south, east, and north, respectively.

Geography
Thungathurthy mandal lies at 223 metres' altitude, or roughly 732 feet.

Demographics
Thungathurthy mandal has a population of 43,342 as of 2011. Thungathurthy is the largest village and Keshavapoor is the smallest village in the mandal.

Villages
 census of India, the mandal has 12 settlements. 
The settlements in the mandal are listed below:

Notes
(†) Mandal headquarter

References

Mandals in Suryapet district